John Cuthbertson (10 March 1932 – 1966) was a Scottish professional footballer who played in the Football League for Mansfield Town.

References

1932 births
1966 deaths
Scottish footballers
Association football forwards
English Football League players
Mansfield Town F.C. players